Klaudia Fabová (born 12 September 1998) is a Slovak footballer who plays as a midfielder for Medyk Konin and has appeared for the Slovakia women's national team.

Career
Fabová has been capped for the Slovakia national team, appearing for the team during the 2019 FIFA Women's World Cup qualifying cycle.

References

External links
 
 
 

1998 births
Living people
Slovak women's footballers
Slovakia women's international footballers
Women's association football midfielders
1. FC Slovácko (women) players
Expatriate women's footballers in the Czech Republic
Expatriate women's footballers in Poland
Slovak expatriate sportspeople in the Czech Republic
Slovak expatriate sportspeople in Poland
Medyk Konin players
Czech Women's First League players